Frederik the Great is a Friesian stallion that lives on Pinnacle Friesians, a farm in Arkansas's Ozark Mountains. He was imported to this farm from the Netherlands when he was six years old. In May 2016, he became known for unofficially being the "world's most handsome horse". He is named after the 18th-century Prussian monarch Frederick the Great. Since then, he has appeared on the Late Show with Stephen Colbert, and received offers to appear in films. As of May 31, 2016, his Facebook page had over 35,000 likes.

References

External links
Frederik the Great's Facebook page
Is this the world's most handsome horse?

Individual male horses
Friesian horses
Individual animals in the United States